Nanmendou station is a transfer station of Line 1 and Line 2, also the first transfer station of the Fuzhou Metro. It is located near the junction of Wushan Road, Bayiqi Road and Gutian Road, Gulou, Fuzhou, Fujian, China. The section of Line 1 started operation on January 6, 2017, while the section of Line 2 started operation on April 26, 2019.

Station details

Services 
The station is served by Line 1 and Line 2 and is currently the only interchange on the Fuzhou Metro network. On Line 1, the station is located between Dongjiekou and Chating stations, with a headway of 5′45″ (towards Fuzhou South Railway Station) or 11′30″ (towards Sanjiangkou) during peak hours and 8′20″ during slack hours. On the Line 2, the station is located between Xiyang and Shuibu stations with a headway of 6′30″ during peak hours and 8′20″ to 10′ during slack hours.

Station design 
The station has three basement levels and currently is the only transfer station on the network, serving two metro lines. The B1 floor is the concourse floor; the north side of B2 floor is the platform level of Line 1 with an island platform, the south side of the B2 floor is the transfer hall; B3 floor is the platform level of Line 2 with an island platform.

Exits and entrances 

 A1: South of the intersection of Daoshan Road and Bayiqi Road
 A2: Connect to Underground Parking of Guanya Plaza
 B: West of Bayiqi Road
 C: Guanya Plaza B1
 D2: Southwest of the intersection of Gutian Road and Bayiqi Road
 D3: Southeast of the intersection of Gutian Road and Bayiqi Road
 E: East of Bayiqi Road
 H: Northeast of the intersection of Gutian Road and Bayiqi Road
 G1: Northwest of the intersection of Gutian Road and Xinquan Road

References 

Railway stations in China opened in 2017
Fuzhou Metro stations